Tame Parata (1837 – 6 March 1917), also known as Thomas Pratt, was a Māori and a Liberal Party Member of Parliament in New Zealand.

Parata was born on Ruapuke Island in Foveaux Strait. His father was a Captain Trapp, a whaler from Massachusetts, and his mother was Koroteke of the Ngāi Tahu, Ngāti Mamoe and Waitaha tribes. It is said that Tame reversed his father's name to Pratt, and transliterated it to Parata in Māori.

He won the Southern Maori electorate in the 1885 by-election after the resignation of Hōri Kerei Taiaroa, and held it to 1911, when he retired; he was succeeded in the electorate by his youngest son, Taare Parata. Subsequently on 13 June 1912 Parata Sr was appointed to the New Zealand Legislative Council, where he sat until he died on 6 March 1917. Hekia Parata, a former member of Parliament, is his great-great-granddaughter.

Notes

References 
 

 

1837 births
1917 deaths
Ngāi Tahu people
New Zealand Liberal Party MPs
Members of the New Zealand Legislative Council
New Zealand MPs for Māori electorates
New Zealand Liberal Party MLCs
Māori MLCs
Members of the New Zealand House of Representatives
New Zealand people of American descent
People from Ruapuke Island
19th-century New Zealand politicians